The Men's madison at the 2011 UCI Track Cycling World Championships was held on March 27. 16 teams participated in the contest.

Results
The race was held at 15:35.

References

2011 UCI Track Cycling World Championships
UCI Track Cycling World Championships – Men's madison